Jones/Derenne Range, also known as Jones' Lower Range, is a historic building located on East Bay Street in Savannah, Georgia, United States. Located in Savannah's Historic District, parts of the building date to 1817. The Savannah Historic District is listed on the National Register of Historic Places, and this building is a contributing property.

History
The building was originally a cotton warehouse.

River Street Inn
The top four floors of 124 East Bay Street have been occupied since 1986 by River Street Inn, named for the street it backs onto and which serves the lower three floors. The inn is a member of the Historic Hotels of America program of the National Trust for Historic Preservation. The first floor (accessible from River Street) is given over to a restaurant.

In 2021, local ABC affiliate WJCL investigated whether it is haunted.

Historic Hotels of America

River Street façade

See also
Buildings in Savannah Historic District

References

External links
River Street Inn official website
The rear of the building from River Street - Google Street View, May 2019

Commercial buildings in Savannah
Commercial buildings completed in 1817
Reportedly haunted locations in Georgia (U.S. state)
Historic Hotels of America
Savannah Historic District